Orbiting Carbon Observatory-2 (OCO-2) is an American environmental science satellite which launched on 2 July 2014. A NASA mission, it is a replacement for the Orbiting Carbon Observatory which was lost in a launch failure in 2009. It is the second successful high-precision (better than 0.3%)  observing satellite, after GOSAT.

Mission overview
The OCO-2 satellite was built by Orbital Sciences Corporation, based around the LEOStar-2 bus. The spacecraft is being used to study carbon dioxide concentrations and distributions in the atmosphere.

OCO-2 was ordered after the original OCO spacecraft failed to achieve orbit. During the first satellite's launch atop a Taurus-XL in February 2009, the payload fairing failed to separate from around the spacecraft and the rocket did not have sufficient power to enter orbit with its additional mass. Although a Taurus launch was initially contracted for the reflight, the launch contract was cancelled after the same malfunction occurred on the launch of the Glory satellite two years later.

United Launch Alliance launched OCO-2 using a Delta II rocket at the beginning of a 30-second launch window at 09:56 UTC (2:56 PDT) on 2 July 2014. Flying in the 7320-10C configuration, the rocket launched from Space Launch Complex 2W at Vandenberg Air Force Base. The initial launch attempt on 1 July at 09:56:44 UTC was scrubbed at 46 seconds on the countdown clock due to a faulty valve on the water suppression system, used to flow water on the launch pad to dampen the acoustic energy during launch.

OCO-2 joined the A-train satellite constellation, becoming the sixth satellite in the group. Members of the A-train fly very close together in sun-synchronous orbit, to make nearly simultaneous measurements of Earth. A particularly short launch window of 30 seconds was necessary to achieve a proper position in the train.

The mission is expected to cost , including design, development, launch and operations.

Column  measurements

Rather than directly measuring concentrations of carbon dioxide in the atmosphere, OCO-2 records how much of the sunlight reflected off the Earth is absorbed by  molecules in an air column. OCO-2 makes measurements in three different spectral bands over four to eight different footprints of approximately  each. About 24 soundings are collected per second while in sunlight and over 10% of these are sufficiently cloud free for further analysis. One spectral band is used for column measurements of oxygen (A-band 0.765 microns), and two are used for column measurements of carbon dioxide (weak band 1.61 microns, strong band 2.06 microns).

In the retrieval algorithm measurements from the three bands are combined to yield column-averaged dry-air mole fractions of carbon dioxide. Because these are dry-air mole fractions, these measurements do not change with water content or surface pressure. Because the molecular oxygen content of the atmosphere (i.e. excluding the oxygen in water vapour) is well known to be 20.95%, oxygen is used as a measure of the total dry air column.  To ensure these measurements are traceable to the World Meteorological Organization, OCO-2 measurements are carefully compared with measurements by the Total Carbon Column Observing Network (TCCON).

Data products
Mission data are provided to the public by the NASA Goddard Earth Science Data and Information Services Center (GES DISC). The Level 1B data product is the least processed and contains records for all collected soundings (about 74,000 soundings per orbit). The Level 2 product contains estimates of the column-averaged dry-air mole fractions of carbon dioxide, among other parameters such as surface albedo and aerosol content. The Level 3 product consists of global maps of carbon dioxide concentrations developed by OCO-2 scientists.

See also 

Space-based measurements of carbon dioxide
Orbiting Carbon Observatory 3
Greenhouse Gases Observing Satellite
TanSat

References

Bibliography

External links

 Orbiting Carbon Observatory at NASA.gov
 Orbiting Carbon Observatory by the Jet Propulsion Laboratory
 Orbiting Carbon Observatory by the JPL Science Division

2014 in the United States
Spacecraft launched in 2014
Earth observation satellites of the United States
Spacecraft launched by Delta II rockets
Articles containing video clips
NASA satellites